Espoir FC are a Beninese football club based in Savalou. They currently play in the Benin Premier League for season 2010.

Football clubs in Benin